Têmûrê Xelîl (born 1949) is a contemporary Yezidi-Kurdish journalist, writer and translator. He is a member of the Kurdish Institute of Paris, editor of the  Kurdish journal Roja Nû and lives in Sweden.

Biography
He was born in Yerevan, Armenian Soviet Socialist Republic (Armenian SSR) and after receiving a bachelor's degree in Physics and Mathematics, worked as a math teacher in the Kurdish village of Sipan for three years. From 1977 to 1992, he worked as a reporter and later as the head of the cultural section in the Kurdish newspaper Rya Teze. From 1981 to 1984 he also served as the editor of the Kurdish section of Radio Yerevan. From 1992 to 1997, he was the deputy of Golos Kurda, a newspaper focused on Kurdish issues published in Russian.

Translations
Kurdên Tirkîyê di dema herî nû da (Kurds of Turkey in the Modern Era), translation of M.A. Hasratyan's book, Kurdish Institute of Brussels, 1994.
Pirsa Kurdan (1891 - 1917), translation of Курдистан и курдская проблема (Kurdistan and the Kurdish Problem) (1964) by M.S. Lazarev from Russian to Kurdish, Roja Nû Publishers, Stockholm, 1999, 496 p.,  
Împêrîyalîzm û pirsa Kurdan (1917-1923), translation of Imperializm i Kurdskiy Vopros(Imperialism and the Kurdish Issue (1917–1923))(1989) by M.S. Lazarev from Russian to Kurdish, Roja Nû Publishers, Stockholm, 2002, 388 pp.,

Books
Bahar, with Nado Maxmudov, Collection of Kurdish Folklore, Yerevan, 1989, 280 pp., ISBN VF09184

References

Biography of Kurdish Novelists, 2005. (in Kurdish)
Biography of Têmûrê Xelîl, Center of Kurdish Writers, November 2008 (in Kurdish)

1949 births
Living people
Writers from Yerevan
Kurdish journalists